Osborne Calvert (4 August 1880 – 26 December 1949) was an Australian rules footballer who played with Geelong in the Victorian Football League (VFL).

Notes

External links 

1880 births
1949 deaths
Australian rules footballers from Victoria (Australia)
Geelong Football Club players
People educated at Geelong Grammar School
Australian military personnel of World War I
Military personnel from Victoria (Australia)